Mavis Anne Freeman (November 7, 1918 – October 1988) was an American competition swimmer who represented the United States in the 1936 Summer Olympics in Berlin, Germany.  Freeman received a bronze medal as a member of the third-place U.S. team in the women's 4×100-meter freestyle relay, together with her teammates Katherine Rawls, Bernice Lapp and Olive McKean.  The Americans finished in a time of 4:40.2, behind the women's teams from the Netherlands and Germany.

See also
 List of Olympic medalists in swimming (women)

References

1918 births
1988 deaths
American female freestyle swimmers
Olympic bronze medalists for the United States in swimming
Sportspeople from New York City
Swimmers at the 1936 Summer Olympics
Medalists at the 1936 Summer Olympics
20th-century American women